Jimmy Millar may refer to:
 Jimmy Millar (footballer, born 1876) (1876–1932), Scottish footballer who played for Middlesbrough, Bradford City and Aberdeen
 Jimmy Millar (footballer, born 1934) (1934–2022), Scottish footballer who played for Rangers and the Scotland national team

See also
 Jimmy Miller (disambiguation) 
 James Millar (disambiguation)